Larix kaempferi, the Japanese larch or karamatsu in Japanese, is a species of larch native to Japan, in the mountains of Chūbu and Kantō regions in central Honshū.

It is a medium-sized to large deciduous coniferous tree reaching 20–40 m tall, with a trunk up to 1 m diameter. The crown is broad conic; both the main branches and the side branches are level, the side branches only rarely drooping. The shoots are dimorphic, with growth divided into long shoots (typically 10–50 cm long) and bearing several buds, and short shoots only 1–2 mm long with only a single bud. The leaves are needle-like, light glaucous green, 2–5 cm long; they turn bright yellow to orange before they fall in the autumn, leaving the pinkish-brown shoots bare until the next spring.

The cones are erect, ovoid-conic and 2–3.5 cm long, with 30–50 reflexed seed scales; they are green when immature, turning brown and opening to release the seeds when mature, 4–6 months after pollination. The old cones commonly remain on the tree for many years, turning dull grey-black.

It grows at altitudes up to 2,900 m on well-drained soils, avoiding waterlogged ground.

The scientific name honours Engelbert Kaempfer. It is also sometimes known by the synonym Larix leptolepis.

Uses
Japanese larch is an important tree in forestry plantations, being grown throughout central and northern Japan (north to Hokkaidō), and also widely in northern Europe, particularly Ireland and Britain. The wood is tough and durable, and is used for general construction work. Small larch poles are widely used for fencing.

Cultivation
Larix kaempferi is used for ornamental purposes in parks and gardens. It is also widely used as material for bonsai.

Diseases
In late 2009 Phytophthora ramorum or sudden oak death disease was first found in Japanese larch trees, in the English counties of Devon, Cornwall and Somerset.  The disease was found in Counties Waterford and Tipperary in Ireland the following year.

Gallery

References

External links
Larix kaempferi images at the Arnold Arboretum of Harvard University Plant Image Database
Gymnosperm Database: Larix kaempferi

kaempferi
Endemic flora of Japan
Trees of Japan
Least concern plants
Deciduous conifers